Nakheel Mall is a shopping mall on the Palm Jumeirah in Dubai, United Arab Emirates.

Construction of the mall started in 2014 and it opened in 2019 at a cost of AED1.2 billion. The mall is accessible via the Palm Jumeirah Monorail, with its own station. There is a three-level multi-storey car park. The mall has five levels of shops, restaurants, and other attractions, including a Depachika Food Hall, Fabyland, Fitness First, an H&M store, Trampo Extreme, a 15-screen VOX Cinemas complex, and a Waitrose supermarket. The View at The Palm provides a high-level view of the Palm Jumeriah from a height of 230 meters on top of the adjacent Palm Tower, opened in 2020.

References

External links
 Nakheel Mall website

2019 establishments in the United Arab Emirates
Shopping malls established in 2019
Shopping malls in Dubai
Nakheel Properties
Palm Jumeirah